The Flame of Freedom (sometimes called Flame of Liberty) is an artwork by French sculptor , installed in Odaiba's Symbol Promenade Park, in Tokyo, Japan. The  sculpture was presented to Japan by France to commemorate France Year.

References

External links

 

Odaiba
Outdoor sculptures in Tokyo